From Nothing to a Little Bit More is the second studio album by English indie rock band the Lathums. It was released on 24 February 2023 through Island. The album reached number one on the UK Albums Chart.

Background
The album was announced on 27 October 2022, accompanied by the release of the single "Say My Name". The band referred to the album as an "act of rebellion having seen the rules of the game". A 10-date UK tour promoting the record was announced the same day.

Track listing

Personnel 
The Lathums
 Alex Moore
 Scott Concepcion
 Ryan Durrans
 Matty Murphy

Additional musicians
 Christopher David Hill
 Gillian Maguire
 John Kettle 
 Josh Poole
 Roland Parsons
 Tom Berry
 Ross Stanley

Charts

References

2023 albums
Island Records albums